88 Leonis is a wide binary star system in the equatorial constellation of Leo, the lion. The system is near the lower limit of visibility to the naked eye with an apparent visual magnitude of 6.27. It is located at a distance of 77 light years from the Sun based on parallax, but is drifting closer with a radial velocity of −4.8 km/s. It has a relatively high proper motion, traversing the celestial sphere at the rate of 0.379 arc seconds per annum.

The primary member of the system, component A, is a yellow-white hued F-type main-sequence star with a stellar classification of F9.5V. It is an estimated 5.7 billion years old and is spinning with a rotation period of 14.3 days. The star has a short magnetic activity cycle that averages around 3.5 years. A second cycle appears to vary over time, lasting 13.7 years at the start of observations then decreasing to 8.6 years over a span of 34 years of measurement. The star has 1.06 times the mass of the Sun and 1.10 times the Sun's radius. It is radiating 1.47 times the luminosity of the Sun from its photosphere at an effective temperature of 6,060 K.

It has a class of G5 and 74% of the Sun's mass.

References

F-type main-sequence stars
Binary stars
Leo (constellation)
Durchmusterung objects
Leonis, 88
100180
056242
4437